Audible is an American online audiobook and podcast service that allows users to purchase and stream audiobooks and other forms of spoken word content. This content can be purchased individually or under a subscription model where the user receives "credits" that can be redeemed for content monthly and receive access to a curated on-demand library of content. Audible is the United States' largest audiobook producer and retailer. The service is owned by Audible, a wholly-owned subsidiary of Amazon.com, Inc., headquartered in Newark, New Jersey.

History
The company's first product was an eponymous portable media player known as the Audible MobilePlayer; released in 1997, the device contained around four megabytes of on-board flash memory storage, which could hold up to two hours of audio. To use the player, consumers would go online to the official Audible website, download the audiobook, and put it onto the player.

In 1999, Microsoft invested $11 million into the company. On October 24, 1999, Audible suffered a setback when its CEO, Andrew J. Huffman, died. Development proceeded, however, leading to Audible licensing the ACELP codec for its downloads in 2000, and Amazon bought a 5 percent stake in the then-publicly traded company the same year.

In 2003, Audible reached an agreement with Apple to be the exclusive provider of audiobooks for iTunes Music Store. This agreement ended in 2017 due to antitrust rulings in the European Union.

Two years later, the service released "Audible Air", which allowed users to download audiobooks directly to PDAs and smartphones. Its content would update automatically, downloading chapters as required that would then delete themselves after they had been listened to. In 2006, the company released its A-List collection, which had famous works read by Anne Hathaway and Annette Bening.

In 2007, CEO Donald Katz moved the company headquarters with 125 employees from suburban Wayne, New Jersey to Newark. The new headquarters was a high-rise building on One Washington Park.

On January 31, 2008, Amazon announced they would purchase Audible for about $300 million. In April of that year, Audible began producing exclusive science fiction and fantasy audiobooks under its "Audible Frontiers" imprint. At launch, 25 titles were released.

In May 2011, the service launched Audiobook Creation Exchange (ACX), an online rights marketplace and production platform. The platform was so successful that in 2012, Audible reported it had received more titles from ACX than from its top three audio providers combined. In March 2012, Audible launched the A-List Collection, a series showcasing Hollywood stars including Claire Danes, Colin Firth, Anne Hathaway, Dustin Hoffman, Samuel L. Jackson, Diane Keaton, Nicole Kidman, and Kate Winslet performing great works of literature. Firth's performance of Graham Greene's The End of the Affair was named Audiobook of the Year at the Audie Awards in 2013.

The service began offering its narration workshops at acting schools, including Juilliard and Tisch School of the Arts; in 2013, Audible's CEO speculated that the company was the largest single employer of actors in the New York area.

In September 2012, Audible introduced a feature known as "Whispersync for Voice", which allows users to continue audiobooks from where they left off reading them on Amazon Kindle.

In 2016, the company announced that it would open a new facility in Newark, New Jersey, the "Innovation Cathedral", in a former Second Presbyterian Church, last used in 1995.

In July 2019, a new feature was announced called Audible Captions, in which machine-generated text would be displayed alongside the audio narration. The company was sued by the Association of American Publishers shortly thereafter for copyright violation. The lawsuit was settled in early 2020, with Audible agreeing not to implement the Captions feature without obtaining express permission.

In November 2020, Audible modified its return and exchange policy in response to concerns by authors, who felt that customers were abusing the policy to listen to audiobooks without paying.

Content and pricing 

Audible's content includes more than 200,000 audio programs from audiobook publishers, broadcasters, entertainers, magazine and newspaper publishers and business information providers. Content includes books of all genres, as well as radio shows (classic and current), speeches, interviews, stand-up comedy, and audio versions of periodicals such as The New York Times and The Wall Street Journal.

The service offered two monthly subscription tiers, "Audible Gold" and "Audible Platinum", priced at US$14.95 and $22.95 respectively: Both services allow users to obtain credits which can be used to purchase audio books (one whole credit for Gold, and two whole credits on Platinum), while Platinum also included additional incentives such as exclusive discounts. On August 24, 2020, Audible replaced both plans with "Audible Premium Plus" (a renaming of Gold, though with the Platinum pricing and credits grandfathered for existing subscribers), and introduced a new $7.95 subscription tier known as "Audible Plus." Both tiers include access to a curated on-demand library of audiobooks, podcasts, and other original productions, while the Audible Plus tier does not include credits.

Once a customer has purchased a title, it remains in that person's library and can be downloaded or streamed at any time. As of April 1, 2019, credits expire one year after issue, and credits prior to this day expire after two years.

Original content 
In May 2015, Audible hired Eric Nuzum, formerly VP of programming at NPR, as its SVP of original content development.

In 2016, the service introduced an on-demand service known as "Audible Channels", which features short-form audio programming from various outlets, including news and other original productions. Access is included as part of Audible's subscription, and also became available to Amazon Prime subscribers. Nuzum compared this strategy to original content created by HBO or Netflix, and stated that the service deliberately avoided use of the word "podcast" as to not alienate listeners unfamiliar with the concept.

Among its original productions are Where Should We Begin? — a relationship podcast with Esther Perel, Sincerely, X''' — a podcast featuring anonymous TED Talks, Ponzi Supernova — a chronicle of the Madoff investment scandal, The Butterfly Effect — a podcast series by Jon Ronson chronicling the impact of PornHub on internet pornography, and West Cork, a true crime podcast investigating an unsolved 1996 murder in West Cork, Ireland.

In August 2018, it was reported that Nuzum was stepping down, and that Amazon had laid off most of the short-form content staff. This move came amid a shift in Audible's original content strategy, including a greater focus on "audiobook-first" deals with writers.

The service's new strategy for original content was announced in fall 2020 with the debut of a new lower-price tier providing access to "Audible Originals." The new tier, called Premium Plus, provided access at the time of introduction to 11,000 audio titles available only by subscription to Audible. These titles included earlier original material, plus new audio productions featuring such creators as Common, Jamie Lee Curtis, Kate Mara, Harvey Fierstein, Michael Caine and Jesse Eisenberg. More recent releases include Newark Mayor Ras Baraka's memoir  and two works by Brown Sugar screenwriter Michael Elliot.

Device support

Audible audio files are compatible with hundreds of audio players, PDAs, mobile phones and streaming media devices.  Devices that do not have AudibleAir capability (allowing users to download content from their library directly into their devices) require a Windows PC or Macintosh to download the files.  Additionally, titles can be played on the PC (using iTunes or AudibleManager).  Titles cannot be burned to CD with AudibleManager. According to Audible's website, they can be burned to CD using Apple's iTunes and some versions of Nero.  (The DRM generally allows a title to be burned to CD once, although the resulting CDs can be played in any CD player and have no copy prevention.) Currently there is no support for Linux, although AudibleManager is known to work through Wine (though this is not officially supported by Audible)., Wine, WineHQ - AudibleManager, Dec 17 2014

Prospective buyers of media players can check the audible.com "Device Center"  to verify whether the device will play .aa files, as well as play them at the desired level of audio fidelity. Audible players are available on Apple iPhones, iPods, Android, and Windows Phone devices.

The Audible App allows for the downloading and playing of audio books purchased via Audible.com and allows the user to store multiple titles for play on mobile devices using the AA file format developed by Audible.

Quality
The following qualities have been available from Audible.  Currently, only the "Format 4" and "Enhanced" formats are available for download.

AAX files are encrypted M4B's. The audio is encoded in variable quality AAC format. While the vast majority of books are encoded at 64 kbit/s, 22.050 kHz, stereo, some are as low as 32k, mono. Radio plays are often encoded at 128kbit/s and 44.1 kHz. Additionally, many audiobooks in Germany are encoded at the latter bitrate and are marketed as "AAX+"; however, there is no difference in the actual file format.

Digital rights management
Audible's .aa file format encapsulates sound encoded in either MP3 or the ACELP speech codec, but includes unauthorized-playback prevention by means of an Audible username and password, which can be used on up to four computers and three smartphones at a time. Licenses are available for schools and libraries.

Audible's content can only be played on selected mobile devices. Its software does enable users to burn a limited number of CDs for unrestricted playback, resulting in CDs that can be copied or converted to unrestricted digital audio formats.

Because of the CD issue, Audible's use of digital rights management on its .aa format has earned it criticism. While multiple software products are capable of removing the Audible DRM ''protection by re-encoding in other formats, Audible has been quick to threaten the software makers with lawsuits for discussing or promoting this ability, as happened with River Past Corp and GoldWave Inc. Responses have varied, with River Past removing the capability from their software, and GoldWave retaining the capability, but censoring discussions about the ability in its support forums. But there are still many other software tools from non-US countries which easily bypass the DRM control of Audible by various methods, including sound recording, virtual CD burning, and even using a media plugin library once provided by Audible themselves. After Apple's abandonment of most DRM measures, Amazon's downloads ceasing to use it, Audible's DRM system is one of the few remaining in place.

Many Audible listings displayed to non-U.S. customers are geo-blocked. According to Audible, this is because the publisher who has provided the title does not have the rights to distribute the file in a given region. Logged in are unable to see titles that are unavailable for purchase.

There were hopes that Amazon, after its purchase of Audible, would remove the DRM from its audiobook selection, in keeping with the current trend in the industry. Nevertheless, Audible's products continue to have DRM, similar to the policy of DRM-protecting their Kindle e-books, which have DRM that allows for a finite, yet undisclosed number of downloads at the discretion of the publisher, however Audible titles that are DRM free can be copied to the Kindle and made functional.

Audible is able to offer DRM-free titles for content providers who wish to do so. FFmpeg 2.8.1+ is capable of playing Audible's .aa and .aax file formats natively.

Market power
Audible operates the Audiobook Creation Exchange, which enables individual authors or publishers to work with professional actors and producers to create audiobooks, which are then distributed to Amazon and iTunes. The service is available to residents of the United States and the United Kingdom. Audible produces 10,000 titles a year and may be the largest employer of actors in New York City.

See also
 RBMedia
 LibriVox
 Storytel

References

External links
 
Behind-the-Scenes Tour of Audible, by Katherine Kellgren

Amazon (company) acquisitions
Audiobook companies and organizations
Retail companies established in 1995
Internet properties established in 1997
Online retailers of the United States
Companies based in Newark, New Jersey
Mass media in Newark, New Jersey
IOS software
Android (operating system) software
Windows Phone software
Windows software
Universal Windows Platform apps
2008 mergers and acquisitions
Subscription services
YouTube sponsors